The circular folds (also known as valves of Kerckring, valves of Kerchkring, plicae circulares, plicae circulae, and valvulae conniventes) are large valvular flaps projecting into the lumen of the small intestine.

Structure
The entire small intestine has circular folds of mucous membrane. The majority extend transversely around the cylinder of the small intestine, for about one-half or two-thirds of its circumference. Some form complete circles. Others have a spiral direction. The latter usually extend a little more than once around the bowel, but occasionally two or three times.

The larger folds are about 1 cm. in depth at their broadest part; but the greater number are smaller. The larger and smaller folds alternate with each other. These can increase the surface area of the small intestine threefold. These larger folds are called plica circularis.

Distribution
They are not found at the commencement of the duodenum, but begin to appear about 2.5 or 5 cm beyond the pylorus.

In the lower part of the descending portion, below the point where the bile and pancreatic ducts enter the small intestine, they are very large and closely approximated.

In the horizontal and ascending portions of the duodenum and upper half of the jejunum they are large and numerous. From this point, down to the middle of the ileum, they diminish considerably in size.

In the lower part of the ileum they almost entirely disappear; hence the comparative thinness of this portion of the intestine, as compared with the duodenum and jejunum.

Difference from other gastrointestinal folds
Unlike the gastric folds in the stomach, they are permanent, and are not obliterated when the intestine is distended.

The spaces between circular folds are smaller than the haustra of the colon, and, in contrast to haustra, circular folds reach around the whole circumference of the intestine. These differences can assist in distinguishing the small intestine from the colon on an abdominal x-ray.

Function
The circular folds slow the passage of the partly digested food along the intestines, and afford an increased surface for absorption. They are covered with small finger-like projections called villi (singular, villus). Each villus, in turn, is covered with microvilli. The microvilli absorb fats and nutrients from the chyme.

History 
The circular folds are also called the valves of Kerckring, valves of Kerchkring, plicae circulares, plicae circulae, and valvulae conniventes.

References

External links
  - "Intestines and Pancreas: The Jejunum and the Ileum"

Digestive system